Manuel Hernández García (born 24 August 1984 in Cartagena, Spain) is a motorcycle road racer. He currently races in the 250cc Grand Prix world championship. He started to race professionally in 2004. His father, also named Manuel Hernández, raced in the same category in the late 1980s.

Grand Prix motorcycle racing career

References

1984 births
Living people
Sportspeople from Cartagena, Spain
Spanish motorcycle racers
FIM Superstock 1000 Cup riders